This is a summary of the electoral history of Robert Muldoon, Prime Minister of New Zealand (1975–84), Leader of the National Party (1974–84), and Member of Parliament for  (1960–91).

Parliamentary elections

1954 election

1957 election

1960 election

1963 election

1966 election

1969 election

1972 election

1975 election

1978 election

1981 election

1984 election

1987 election

1990 election

Leadership elections

1972 leadership election

1984 leadership election

Notes

References

Muldoon, Robert